Anna-Clara Beatrice Tidholm (born Tjerneld on 7 January 1946 in Stockholm, Sweden) is a Swedish children's writer and illustrator. She grew up on Djurgården in Stockholm. Since 1970, she lives at a small farm in Arbrå.

Bibliography 
 Tillbaks till naturen - 1970
 Bolaget, pluttarna och moskrogafolket - 1970 (together with Mats Arvidsson)
 Vad Bosse fick se - 1971 (together with Thomas Tidholm)
 Jätten och ekorren - 1980
 Korven - 1981
 Sagan om osten - 1981
 Pojken och hans ulliga får - 1983
 Åke-boken - 1983 (together with Thomas Tidholm)
 Spårlöst borta - 1984 (together with Ulf Nilsson)
 Glöm inte jordnötterna - 1985 (together with Thomas Tidholm)
 Kanin med nedhängande öron - 1985
 Barnens svenska historia - 1986 (together with Sonja Hulth)
 Arbete, arbetstider och tidsanvändning i tre svenska kommuner - 1987 (together with Ola Sabel)
 Ett jobb för Jacko - 1987 (together with Thomas Tidholm)
 Resan till Ugri La Brek - 1987 (together with Thomas Tidholm)
 Jims vinter - 1988 (together with Thomas Tidholm)
 Ett fall för Nalle - 1988
 Se upp för elefanterna - 1989 (together with Ulf Nilsson)
 Balladen om Marjan och Rolf - 1989 (together with Thomas Tidholm)
 Vill ha syster - 1991 (together with Thomas Tidholm)
 Pojken och stjärnan - 1991 (together with Barbro Lindgren)
 Sova över - 1992 (together with Siv Widerberg)
 Knacka på - 1992
 Förr i tiden i skogen - 1993 (together with Thomas Tidholm)
 Allihop - 1993
 Hitta på - 1993
 Ut och gå - 1993
 Kaspers alla dagar - 1994 (together with Thomas Tidholm)
 Varför då? - 1994
 De älskade film - 1995 (together with Thomas Tidholm)
 Ture kokar soppa - 1995
 Ture blåser bort - 1995
 Lanas land - 1996 (together with Thomas Tidholm)
 Ture skräpar ner - 1996
 En svart hund - 1997 (together with Thomas Tidholm)
 Ture sitter och tittar - 1997
 Nalle hej - 1997
 Ture blir blöt - 1997
 Ture skottar snö - 1997
 Flickornas historia - 1997 (together with Kristina Lindström)
 Ture borstar tänderna - 1998
 Ture får besök - 1998
 Alla djuren - 1998
 Se ut - 1999 (together with Lisa Berg Ortman)
 Långa ben - 1999 (together with Thomas Tidholm)
 Läsa bok - 1999
 Apan fin - 1999
 Kaninen som längtade hem - 1999 (together with Lilian Edvall)
 Flickan som bara ville läsa - 2000 (together with Sonja Hulth)
 Lilla grodan - 2000
 Mera mat - 2000
 Adjö, herr Muffin - 2002 (together with Ulf Nilsson)
 Jolanta - 2002 (together with Thomas Tidholm)
 Hela natten - 2002
 Lite sjuk - 2002
 Jag behöver lillbrorsan - 2002 (together with Solja Krapu)
 Flickornas historia, Europa - 2002 (together with Kristina Lindström)
 Pappan som försvann - 2003
 Alla får åka med - 2004
 Hanna, huset, hunden - 2004
 Väck inte den björn som sover - 2004 (together with )
 När vi fick Felix - 2005 (together with Thomas Tidholm)
 En liten stund - 2006
 Det var en gång en räv som sprang i mörkret - 2014 (together with Thomas Tidholm)

Prizes and awards 
 Elsa Beskow Plaque 1986 (for ”her entire production”)
 Expressen Heffalump 1987
 Deutscher Jugendliteraturpreis 1992 (for Resan till Ugri La Brek)
 Wettergren's Children's Book Column 1993
 Astrid Lindgren Prize 1997
 Countryside's Writer's Scholarship 1998
 ABF's Literature Prize 2001
 August Prize 2002 (for Adjö, herr Muffin)
 BMF Plaque 2002
 Book Jury (category 0–6 år) 2002
 Carl von Linné Plaque 2003 (for Flickornas historia, Europa)

References

1946 births
Living people
Writers from Stockholm
Swedish illustrators
Swedish women children's writers
Swedish children's writers
Swedish children's book illustrators
Swedish women illustrators
20th-century Swedish writers
20th-century Swedish women writers
21st-century Swedish writers
21st-century Swedish women writers
Artists from Stockholm
August Prize winners